Pape Moussa Konaté (born 3 April 1993) is a Senegalese professional footballer who plays as a forward for Georgian club Dinamo Batumi and the Senegal national team. He was called up for the 2018 FIFA World Cup.

Career

Early career
Moussa Konaté started his career playing for Senegalese second division club ASC Toure Kunda de Mbour, helping them to win promotion to the top division and win the Senegal FA Cup for the 2010 season, which resulted in a 2011 CAF Confederation Cup appearance. In spring 2011 Konaté went to Israel for a months trial with Maccabi Tel Aviv. He impressed Maccabi's coach Moti Ivanir enough to become Maccabi's first signing for the 2011–12 season.

Maccabi Tel Aviv
After signing a two-year contract with the club, Konaté became Maccabi's fifth foreign player in the squad. He made his debut playing in the UEFA Europa League second qualifying round against FK Khazar Lankaran scoring the first goal and assisting the second for  Eliran Atar in Maccabi's victory 3–1.

Krasnodar
After excelling playing for Senegal in the 2012 Summer Olympics scoring five goals, Konaté joined Russian club FC Krasnodar for a fee of €2 million. After joining Krasnodar, he revealed he had rejected Premier League clubs in favour of Krasnodar.

Loan to Genoa
On 12 July 2013, Konaté joined Italian Serie A side Genoa on a season-long loan deal.

Amiens
On 13 August 2017, Konaté signed a four-year contract with Amiens SC.

Dijon
Following Amiens's relegation from Ligue 1 in the 2019–20 season, Konaté signed a  three-year contract with Dijon FCO on 20 October 2020, for a fee of €2.4 million.

Loan to Espérance Tunis
On 15 September 2021, Konaté joined Tunisian side Espérance Tunis on a season-long loan deal with an option to buy.

Loan to Sivasspor
On 12 February 2022, Konaté moved on loan to Sivasspor in Turkey.

Dinamo Batumi
On 24 January 2023, Konaté joined Dinamo Batumi in Georgia on a one-year deal.

International career
Konaté started all of Senegal's matches at the 2012 Olympic tournament in which the nation reached the quarter-finals. In the first group game at Old Trafford, he scored an 82nd-minute equaliser in a 1–1 draw with hosts Great Britain.

Konaté was named in the Senegal squad for the 2015 Africa Cup of Nations after Diafra Sakho withdrew due to injury.

In May 2018 he was named in Senegal's 23-man squad for the 2018 FIFA World Cup in Russia.

Career statistics

Club

International

Scores and results list Senegal's goal tally first, score column indicates score after each Konaté goal.

Honours
Sion
Swiss Cup: 2014–15

Sivasspor
Turkish Cup: 2021–22

References

Living people
1993 births
Senegalese footballers
Association football forwards
Senegal international footballers
Maccabi Tel Aviv F.C. players
FC Krasnodar players
Genoa C.F.C. players
FC Sion players
Amiens SC players
Dijon FCO players
Espérance Sportive de Tunis players
Sivasspor footballers
FC Dinamo Batumi players
Israeli Premier League players
Russian Premier League players
Serie A players
Swiss Super League players
Ligue 1 players
Ligue 2 players
Tunisian Ligue Professionnelle 1 players
Süper Lig players
Senegalese expatriate footballers
Expatriate footballers in Israel
Expatriate footballers in Russia
Expatriate footballers in Italy
Expatriate footballers in Switzerland
Expatriate footballers in France
Expatriate footballers in Tunisia
Expatriate footballers in Turkey
Expatriate footballers in Georgia (country)
Senegalese expatriate sportspeople in Israel
Senegalese expatriate sportspeople in Russia
Senegalese expatriate sportspeople in Italy
Senegalese expatriate sportspeople in Switzerland
Senegalese expatriate sportspeople in France
Senegalese expatriate sportspeople in Tunisia
Senegalese expatriate sportspeople in Turkey
Senegalese expatriate sportspeople in Georgia (country)
Olympic footballers of Senegal
Footballers at the 2012 Summer Olympics
2015 Africa Cup of Nations players
2017 Africa Cup of Nations players
2018 FIFA World Cup players
2019 Africa Cup of Nations players